Harrold Hall was a country house in Harrold, Bedfordshire, England. Dated to 1210, the house was demolished in 1961.

References

Country houses in Bedfordshire
Demolished buildings and structures in England
1961 disestablishments in England
British country houses destroyed in the 20th century
Buildings and structures demolished in 1961